Martin Wade Roberts (born 19 June 1966) is an Australian former swimmer who competed in the 1988 Summer Olympics and 1992 Summer Olympics.

See also
 List of Commonwealth Games medallists in swimming (men)

References

1966 births
Living people
Australian male butterfly swimmers
Australian male freestyle swimmers
Australian male medley swimmers
Olympic swimmers of Australia
Swimmers at the 1988 Summer Olympics
Swimmers at the 1992 Summer Olympics
Commonwealth Games medallists in swimming
Commonwealth Games gold medallists for Australia
Commonwealth Games silver medallists for Australia
Commonwealth Games bronze medallists for Australia
Universiade medalists in swimming
Swimmers at the 1990 Commonwealth Games
Universiade gold medalists for Australia
20th-century Australian people
Medallists at the 1990 Commonwealth Games